The Crossman Bridge, also known as the Gilbert Road Bridge, is a truss bridge located in Warren, Massachusetts, carrying Gilbert Road across the Quaboag River. Built in 1888 and rehabilitated in 2004-08, it is one of the few surviving lenticular truss bridges in Massachusetts, and the only known lenticular pony truss bridge. The bridge was added to the National Register of Historic Places in 2010.

Description and history
The Crossman Bridge is located just west of West Warren, on Gilbert Road just south of its junction with Main Street (Massachusetts Route 67). The bridge deck is supported by a modern system of steel beams and stringers. A decorative railing, originally protective in nature, has been preserved, augmented by a modern guard rail.

The bridge was built in 1888 by the Berlin Iron Bridge Co. at a cost $2,175.  It is only one of three known lenticular bridges in the state, and the only one that is a pony truss (without connection between the trusses above the roadway).  It was the first metal bridge on the site, which has a history of bridge crossings dating to 1795.  It was named for the A. W. Crossman factory, which stood just south of the river to the east of Gilbert Road.  From 2004 to 2008, it was removed for repairs, rehabilitated and reassembled by U.S. Bridge of Cambridge, Ohio.

See also
National Register of Historic Places listings in Worcester County, Massachusetts
List of bridges on the National Register of Historic Places in Massachusetts

References 

Bridges completed in 1888
Bridges in Worcester County, Massachusetts
Road bridges on the National Register of Historic Places in Massachusetts
Lenticular truss bridges in the United States
National Register of Historic Places in Worcester County, Massachusetts
Steel bridges in the United States